Piyyut is Jewish liturgical poetry, in Hebrew or occasionally Aramaic. Since the fifth century CE, piyyutim (the plural of "piyyut") have been written in many different genres and subgenres. Most of these are defined by the function that the given poem fulfills in the context of Jewish prayer service; but a few are defined by other criteria, such as content.

Yotzer sequence—a series of poems, which adorn the blessings surrounding the morning recitation of the Shema‘. Note that the Shema‘ itself is always kept in its statutory form, and not adorned with poetry, because it is made up of passages taken straight from the Bible.
1. Guf yotzer (or just yotzer)—the first poem of the sequence, coming at the very beginning of the blessing "Yotzer Or" (on the heavenly luminaries). In a sequence written for a weekday, this is a very short poem, of one stanza, and leads straight to the conclusion of the blessing; parts 1a, 2, 3, and 4 are skipped. In a sequence written for a Sabbath or festival, this poem can be anywhere from about 12 lines to several hundred lines.
1b. Silluq le-yotzer. A "conclusion" to the guf yotzer, forming a bridge to the Qedusha in the middle of the blessing on the heavenly luminaries.
2. Ofan. A poem bridging between the first and second verses of the Qedusha.
3. Me'ora. A poem forming the bridge between the second verse of the Qedusha and the conclusion of the blessing on the luminaries. 
4. Ahava. A poem leading into the conclusion of the blessing regarding God's love for the Jewish people.
(The Shema‘ itself comes here.) 
5. Zulath. A poem leading from the beginning of the blessing after the Shema‘ (about the truth of the Shema‘ and God's redemption of the Israelites from Egypt) to the verse "Mi Khamokha" ("Who is like unto Thee?"), Exodus 15:11.
6. Mi Khamokha. A poem leading from the verse "Mi Khamokha" (Ex. 15:11) to the verse "Adonai Yimlokh" (Ex. 15:18). 
7. Ge'ulla. A poem leading from "Adonai Yimlokh" (Ex. 15:18) to the conclusion of the benediction about the truth of the Shema‘ and the redemption from Egypt. In 9th-11th century Middle Eastern yotzer sequences, the Ge'ulla is usually split into two smaller poems, the "Adonai Malkenu" and the "Ve‘ad Matai".

Qerova—a series of piyyutim, which adorn the blessings of the ‘Amida. There are a few types of these:
Shiv‘ata: A series of seven poems, of even length, to adorn the `Amida of a Sabbath or festival. Such `Amidot have seven blessings, so there is exactly one poem per blessing. (Note that these were written only for the `amidot of Musaf, the additional service, and minha and `arvit, the afternoon and evening services; for the morning service of a Sabbath or festival, the `Amida would be adorned with a Qedushta. See below.)
Shemone `Esre: A series of eighteen poems, of even length, to adorn the `Amida of a weekday. Such `Amidot have eighteen blessings, so there is exactly one poem per blessing.
Qedushta: A series of poems adorning the first three blessings of the morning (Shaharit) `amida of a sabbath or festival. (Or Musaf of Rosh Hashana, or any of the four `amidot of the daytime of Yom Kippur. The Qedushta consists of several parts, each with their own names.
1. Magen
2. Mehayye
3. Meshallesh
4. "Piyyut 4" ("El Na")
5. "Piyyut 5"
6. Qiqlar
7. Rahit. (There may be several rahitim, in which case they are numbered 7a, 7b, 7c, et cetera.)
8. Silluq. A long piyyut, often closer to rhyming prose than to any kind of metrical poetry. The silluq, at its conclusion, leads into the first verse of Qedusha.
9: Qedusha-piyyutim. These poems, often absent from Qedushta'ot, were written to be recited between the verses of the Qedusha.
Qedushat Shiv‘ata
Qedushat Shemone `Esre

Some Shiv‘atot, almost exclusively for great festivals, have expansions:
Guf -- an expansion in the fourth blessing of a festival `amida. This is the central blessing of the festival `amida, and the only one where the theme of the blessing is the festival itself.
Dew or Rain expansion: inserted into the second blessing of the musaf `amida of the first day of Passover ("Dew", Tal, for that is when the season and liturgy change to the hot, dry season) or of Shemini `Atzereth ("Rain", Geshem, for that is when the season and liturgy change to the cold, rainy season).

Some piyyutim of the Shemone-`Esre genre, for special weekdays, have expansions:
Purim expansions
Qinot
Selihot (many later communities moved these out of the qerova, or out of the `amida entirely, and recited them in less formal liturgical contexts)

Nishmat
Azharot
`Avoda
Ketubba for Shavu‘ot
Targum piyyutim
Ma`arivim
Bikkur (also known as Tosefet Le-ma‘ariv -- an expansion at the end of a sequence of ma‘ariv piyyutim; found only in Ashkenaz.
Elohekhem
Magen Avot piyyutim
Piyyutified blessing
Piyyutified Grace After Meals
Siyyum Le-hallel
El Adon and Shevaḥ Notnim
Zemer (usually for the Sabbath).
Hosha‘na

References 

Jewish liturgical poems